Franklin "Heck" Heifer (January 18, 1854 – August 29, 1893) was a first baseman and outfielder in the National Association for the 1875 Boston Red Stockings.

References

External links

1854 births
1893 deaths
Major League Baseball first basemen
Major League Baseball outfielders
Boston Red Stockings players
Erie (minor league baseball) players
Buffalo (minor league baseball) players
Binghamton Crickets (1870s) players
Syracuse Stars (minor league baseball) players
Worcester Grays players
Reading Actives players
Providence Grays (minor league) players
Oswego Starchboxes players
Reading (minor league baseball) players
19th-century baseball players
Baseball players from Pennsylvania
Sportspeople from Reading, Pennsylvania